Kappa Eta Kappa is a co-ed professional fraternity, nationally recognized in the United States, that was founded in 1923 at the University of Iowa. KHK requires that members are majoring or will major in electrical engineering, computer engineering or computer science.

Ideals
The preamble to the constitution of KHK states the principles of the organization.

"Believing that the attainment of education as well as technical training is the aim of all true engineers, we band ourselves together to foster and promote fraternal relationships among electrical engineering students; to strive at all times for the maintenance of a complete and lasting understanding and fellowship between faculty and students; to unceasingly cherish and develop the character and ideals of service as the necessary attributes of the profession."

History
After the founding of the Alpha chapter at Iowa in 1923, other chapters were quickly added. There were five chapters that closed because of World War II.  Active chapters listed in bold, inactive chapters listed in italics.

See also

 Professional fraternities and sororities

References

Student organizations established in 1923
1923 establishments in Iowa
Professional fraternities and sororities in the United States
Professional Fraternity Association